Nabil de Freij (born August 31, 1955) is a Lebanese politician. He was born in Beirut.
 Minister of Administrative Development. 
 Married to Mrs. Maya Robert Barakat with two children. 
 Studied at Notre Dame College of Jamhour. 
 A graduate of the Higher Institute of Commerce and Management – Paris (1975–1980). 
 Member of the board of directors of the Agricultural Research Institute (1989–2000). 
 Member of the board of directors of Alban Lebanon (Candia). 
 Secretary of the Association to protect and improve the descendants of Arabian horses (1987–1998). 
 President of the Association to protect and improve the descendants of Arabian Horses (since February 1998). 
 Was elected as Member of Parliament for the first time on September 3, 2000 (seat of minorities). 
 A member of the Finance and Budget Committee (since 2000). 
 A member of the Agriculture and Tourism Committee (2000–2005). 
 A member of the Francophone Parliamentary Committee (since 2000). 
 A member of the Office of the General Assembly of the International Francophone Parliament (since 2003). 
 Was elected as Member of Parliament for the second time on 29 May 2005 on the list of Prime Minister Rafic Hariri (seat of minorities). 
 Chairman of the National, Trade and Industry and Economy Planning Committee (since July 18, 2005). 
 Was elected as Member of Parliament for the third time on June 7, 2009 on the list of Future Movement (seat of minorities).

References

1955 births
Living people
Lebanese politicians
Lebanese Roman Catholics
Lebanese Forces politicians
Future Movement politicians